The  is an anime television series which aired on NTV in Japan for 32 episodes from 25 April to 26 December 1986 in the 7–7:30 pm time slot. The series was unusual in that each episode (with only a couple of exceptions) was a stand-alone story based on popular and well known modern Japanese stories. The series was sponsored by Sumitomo Life Insurance.

The branch offices and agents of Sumitomo Life Insurance heavily promoted the series with posters in their offices as well as commercials directly after each episode.

Synopsis
The title of the series was derived from the Nippon Animation series World Masterpiece Theater, creating a Japan Masterpiece Theater series. While each story would be told in 1–3 episodes, they shared a common theme of "modern Japanese classics", and were designed to emulate the success of the Princess Sarah series.

Each episode (or set of episodes) retells using animation a popular modern Japanese story from the past 100 years or so.

List of episodes
Titles marked with ◎ were released by Shinchō Bunko in a manga form. Titles marked with ★ were part of the  series released by Kin no Hoshi.

Sources:

References

External links
 青春アニメ全集 (official Nippon Animation site)
 EVRウエブカタログ (official DVD site)

1986 anime television series debuts
Central Park Media
Comedy anime and manga
Drama anime and manga
Historical anime and manga
Horror anime and manga
Nippon Animation
Romance anime and manga
Boxing in anime and manga
Supernatural anime and manga
Nippon TV original programming
Sumitomo Life
1986 Japanese television series debuts
1986 Japanese television series endings